Pamelyn Chee is a Singaporean actress.

She recently completed work on Eddie Huang's Boogie by Focus Features. She was also in the feature sequel Beyond Skyline, alongside Frank Grillo and Iko Uwais. She also guest-starred on Freeform's Stitchers.

She played the titular role in HBO Asia's Grace, headlining the show with Russell Wong. This show was nominated for 8 awards at the Asian Television Awards.

She also starred alongside Joan Chen and Chin Han, Don Hany, and Michael Dorman  in HBO Asia's Serangoon Road. The show was nominated for an "AACTA" for best drama series in Australia.

Pamelyn was discovered on Youtube by Heidi Levitt for Wayne Wang's TIFF darling feature Princess of Nebraska, speaks fluent Mandarin and Cantonese, and continues to travel between Asia and the US for work.

Filmography

References

External links
Profile on Fly Entertainment

Singaporean television actresses
Singaporean people of Chinese descent
Victoria Junior College alumni
New York University alumni
Living people
21st-century Singaporean actresses
Year of birth missing (living people)